Allowal is a small village in Nakodar.  Nakodar is a tehsil in the city Jalandhar of Indian state of Punjab.

About 
Allowal lies on the Nakodar-Jalandhar road. It is almost 3 km from Nakodar bus stand. The nearest main road to Allowal is Nakodar-Jalandhar road. The nearest Railway station to this village is Nakodar Railway station.

STD code 
Allowal's STD code is 01821.

References

An Indian website showing Allowal's Details

Villages in Jalandhar district
Villages in Nakodar tehsil